Barabbas is a 2012 American-Italian television movie directed by Roger Young.

Cast 

 Billy Zane as Barabbas
 Cristiana Capotondi as Ester
 Filippo Nigro as Pontius Pilate
 Anna Valle as  Claudia Procula
 Tommaso Ramenghi as Dan
 Matteo Branciamore as Judas
 Hristo Shopov as Kedar
 Marco Foschi as Jesus
Paolo Seganti as  Valerius Flaccus

See also 
Barabbas (1953)
Barabbas (1961)

References

External links

2012 television films
2012 films
English-language Italian films
Italian drama films
Italian television films
American television films
Films based on the Gospels
Films based on Swedish novels
Films directed by Roger Young
2012 drama films
Cultural depictions of Pontius Pilate
Remakes of Italian films
Television remakes of films
2010s English-language films